The Marijuana-Logues is an Off-Broadway comedy show in New York City.  Arj Barker, Doug Benson and Tony Camin are the creators and performers.  It is a four-man stand-up comedy show, with the majority of the humor centered on the drug marijuana. The show's title is a play on the long-running Broadway show The Vagina Monologues.  The show began its run in March 2004. There is also an original cast recording released in 2004 by Comedy Central, and a book.  When the show toured, actor Tommy Chong became part of the tour for two cities.  His legal concerns, including that audience members were actually smoking marijuana at some of the shows early in its tour, and pressure from his probation officer ultimately caused him to leave the show.

Track listing

References

External links
Playbill review

Plays about cannabis
Cannabis media in the United States
Off-Broadway plays
2004 plays
2004 live albums
Comedy Central Records live albums
Stand-up comedy albums
Spoken word albums by American artists
Arj Barker albums
2000s comedy albums